Leland Reynolds Croft (November 5, 1898 – January 28, 1984) was an American football player and petroleum engineer.

Croft was bor in 1898 in Mineral Point, Wisconsin, and attended Mineral Point High School. He attended the Wisconsin School of Engineering where he received a degree in petroleum engineering.

He played one game as a guard in the National Football League for the Racine Legion during the 1924 NFL season.

Croft moved Texas by the 1930s. As of 1935, he was employed Stanolind Oil Company in Houston. He moved to Odessa, Texas, in 1945. He worked a geologist, engineer, and appraiser in the oil business. From 1954 to 1964, he also served on the board of regents of Odessa College. He died in 1984 at the Medical Center Hospital in Odessa.

References

1898 births
1984 deaths
People from Mineral Point, Wisconsin
Players of American football from Wisconsin
Racine Legion players
American football offensive guards
Wisconsin–Platteville Pioneers football players